Tamil Nadu Talkies was an Indian film production company producing films in Telugu and Tamil languages. Headed by S. Saundara Rajan, it was founded in the 1930s. Tamil Nadu Talkies was one of the foremost names in early Tamil cinema from the 1930s through 1950s, but later fell into obscurity.

Legendary Telugu film actors Gummadi and Krishna Kumari made their debut through the films produced by the company.

Films produced 

 Bhaktha Naradar (1942)
Chenchu Lakshmi (1943)
Pankajavalli (1947)
 Adrushtadeepudu (1950)
 Navvite Navarathnalu (1951)

References 

Film production companies based in Chennai
Film production companies of Andhra Pradesh
1930 establishments in India
Mass media companies established in the 1930s